Strabomantis zygodactylus, also known as the Danubio robber frog, is a species of frog in the family Strabomantidae.
It is endemic to Colombia.
Its natural habitats are subtropical or tropical moist lowland forest and rivers.
It is threatened by habitat loss.

References

zygodactylus
Amphibians of Colombia
Endemic fauna of Colombia
Taxonomy articles created by Polbot
Amphibians described in 1983